Mount Rochfort is a mountain peak  in elevation, located approximately 10 km east of Westport in the Buller District on the West Coast of the South Island of New Zealand.  It rises above the south-west portion of the Denniston Plateau and overlooks the town of Westport and the plains of the Buller River.

Toponymy 
Mount Rochfort was named after John Rochfort (1832–1893), who was a surveyor and engineer involved in mineral surveys in the Buller District. Rochfort was the first pākehā to climb the peak and Julius von Haast named it.

Mount Rochfort Conservation Area 
In 2018, the Minister of Conservation Eugenie Sage and Minister of Energy Resources Megan Woods declined an application to mine  near Te Kuha, in the Mount Rochfort Conservation Area.  The announcement including a statement about the conservation values of the area: 

The Mount Rochfort Conservation Area is land classified in the stewardship category by the Department of Conservation.

Access 
There is a 4WD access road from the Denniston Plateau to the summit of Mount Rochford, for servicing a transmission site on the peak.

There is a water supply reserve for the town of Westport on the slopes of Mount Rochfort.

There is a lake to the north west called Lake Rochfort.

References 

Mountains of the West Coast, New Zealand
Buller District